Blumentritt station is an elevated Manila Light Rail Transit (LRT) station situated on Line 1. The station serves the districts of Tondo, Santa Cruz, and Sampaloc in Manila. The station itself is located near Blumentritt Road, which the station was named after. The street itself is named to honor Bohemian professor Ferdinand Blumentritt, one of José Rizal's closest associates and a sympathizer of the Propaganda Movement.

With the ongoing construction of NLEX Connector (previously known as NLEX-SLEX Connector Road, the station was built below the elevated expressway.

Blumentritt station serves as the seventh station for Line 1 trains headed to Baclaran, the fourteenth station for trains headed to Roosevelt, and is one of the five Line 1 stations serving Santa Cruz District, the others being Tayuman, Bambang, Doroteo Jose, and Carriedo.

It is the second-to last station on Rizal Avenue before the line shifts to Rizal Avenue Extension at Abad Santos station.

Blumentritt station is one of the blast locations where a bomb exploded in a train cab on December 30, 2000, as part of the Rizal Day bombings that caused 22 fatalities and around 100 injuries.

Transportation links
A Philippine National Railways (PNR) station with the same name exists just a short walk from the station. Buses, jeepneys and taxis that ply Rizal Avenue and nearby routes stop at Blumentritt station, where there is a nearby transportation terminal. Numerous tricycles could also be found near the station, servicing quick transportation from people disembarking from the station and from the jeepneys.

See also
List of rail transit stations in Metro Manila
Manila Light Rail Transit System

References

Manila Light Rail Transit System stations
Railway stations opened in 1985
Buildings and structures in Santa Cruz, Manila
1985 establishments in the Philippines